Victoria Infant School may refer to:

Victoria Infant School (Barrow-in-Furness) — Barrow-in-Furness, Cumbria
Victoria Infant School (Tipton) — Tipton, West Midlands